Casimiro is a given name. Notable people with the name include:

 Casimiro de Abreu (1839–1860), Brazilian poet, novelist and playwright
 Casimiro Alegre (1741–1825), Argentine militia officer and landowner
 Casimiro Andrada, Filipino politician, mayor of Balasan
 Casimiro Asumu Nze (born 1975), Equatoguinean sprinter
 Casimiro Berenguer, Puerto Rican nationalist 
 Casimiro Castro (1826-1889), Mexican painter and lithographer
 Casimiro Díaz (1693–1746), Spanish Augustinian friar 
 Casimiro Gennari (1839–1914), Italian Catholic cardinal
 Casimiro Gómez Ortega (1741–1818), Spanish physician and botanist
 Casimiro Monteiro (1920–1993), Portuguese Goan assassin
 Casimiro Montenegro Filho (1904–2000), Brazilian army and air force officer
 Casimiro Olañeta (1795–1860), Bolivian politician
 Casimiro de Oliveira (1907–1970), Portuguese racing driver
 Casimiro Radice (1834–1908), Italian painter
 Casimiro Sainz (1853–1898), Spanish painter
 Casimiro Torres (1906-?), Chilean footballer
 Casimiro Ynares III (born 1973), Filipino politician
 Casimiro (born 1993), Brazilian sports journalist and streamer

See also
 Casimiro (surname)

Spanish masculine given names